Thomas William Landrum (born August 17, 1957) is a former right-handed Major League Baseball relief pitcher who played eight seasons with four teams, the Cincinnati Reds, Chicago Cubs, the Pittsburgh Pirates and the Montreal Expos from  to .

In 361.1 innings pitched over 268 games, Landrum handled 76 total chances (31 putouts, 45 assists) without an error for a perfect 1.000 fielding percentage.

His father Joe Landrum pitched for the Brooklyn Dodgers in the 1950s.

Bill Landrum has retired and lives in Columbia, South Carolina.

See also
 List of second-generation Major League Baseball players

External links

Retrosheet
The Baseball Gauge
Venezuela Winter League

1957 births
Living people
American expatriate baseball players in Canada
Baseball players from Columbia, South Carolina
Buffalo Bisons (minor league) players
Chicago Cubs players
Cincinnati Reds players
Denver Zephyrs players
Gulf Coast Cubs players
Indianapolis Indians players
Iowa Cubs players
Leones del Caracas players
American expatriate baseball players in Venezuela
Lubbock Crickets players
Major League Baseball pitchers
Montreal Expos players
Nashville Sounds players
Pittsburgh Pirates players
South Carolina Gamecocks baseball players
Spartanburg Methodist Pioneers baseball players
Tampa Tarpons (1957–1987) players
Tigres de Aragua players
University of South Carolina alumni
Waterbury Reds players
Wichita Aeros players